Issak Tesfom Okubamariam (born 28 February 1991) is an Eritrean cyclist, who most recently rode for the Martinican amateur team Pédale Pilotine.

Major results

2011
 1st Stage 4 Tour of Eritrea
2012
 Tour d'Algérie
1st  Mountains classification
1st Stage 4
 National Road Championships
2nd Road race
4th Time trial
 4th Overall Tour of Eritrea
1st Stage 3
2013
 African Road Championships
1st  Road race
1st  Under-23 road race
 National Road Championships
3rd Time trial
6th Road race
 5th Overall Tour of Eritrea
 7th Circuit of Asmara
 7th Fenkel Northern Redsea
2014
 6th Time trial, National Road Championships
2015
 National Road Championships
2nd Road race
7th Time trial
 6th Mayday Classic, KZN Autumn Series
2016
 1st Overall UCI Africa Tour
 African Road Championships
1st  Road race
1st  Team time trial (with Elyas Afewerki, Mekseb Debesay and Amanuel Ghebreigzabhier)
 1st Massawa Circuit
 3rd Overall Tour du Rwanda
1st Stage 7
 3rd Critérium International de Blida
 3rd Critérium International d'Alger
 4th Overall La Tropicale Amissa Bongo
 4th Overall Sharjah International Cycling Tour
1st Mountains classification
 6th Overall Tour de Blida
 6th Circuit de Constantine
 7th Asmara Circuit
 9th Overall Tour d'Oranie
1st Mountains classification
 9th Overall Tour International de Sétif
 9th Fenkil Northern Red Sea Challenge
 10th Overall Tour of Eritrea
 10th Grand Prix d'Oran
2017
 2nd Overall La Tropicale Amissa Bongo
 4th Overall Tour of Eritrea
 5th Massawa Circuit
 9th Overall Tour du Rwanda
 9th Fenkil Northern Red Sea Challenge
2018
 1st  Mountains classification La Tropicale Amissa Bongo

References

External links

1991 births
Living people
Eritrean male cyclists
21st-century Eritrean people